Parukkal (East) is a village in the Udayarpalayam taluk of Ariyalur district, Tamil Nadu, India.

Demographics 

As per the 2001 census, Parukkal (East) had a total population of 889 with 469 males and 420 females.

References 

Villages in Ariyalur district